Jacques Mauchien (9 June 1926 – 31 August 1998) was a French field hockey player. He competed in the men's tournament at the 1960 Summer Olympics.

References

External links
 

1926 births
1998 deaths
French male field hockey players
Olympic field hockey players of France
Field hockey players at the 1960 Summer Olympics
Field hockey players from Brussels